Seok Rae-myeong (May 19, 1936 – May 20, 2003) is a South Korean film director. Seok made his directorial debut with Until Next Time (1972). After the success of his film, Yalkae, a Joker in High School (1977), he directed Mischief's Marching Song (1977), Prankster of Girl's High School (1977) and Our High School Days (1978), leading a boom in teen movies during the late 1970s.

In 2009, Yalkae, a Joker in High School is issued as part of the third series of Korean film stamps by Korea Post, which also includes The Road to Sampo, Never Ever Forget Me and Chilsu and Mansu.

Filmography 
Until Next Time (1972)
Yalkae, a Joker in High School (1977)
K&J (1977)
Mischief's Marching Song (1977)
Prankster of Girl's High School (1977)
Our High School Days (1978)
Energy Teacher (1978)
The Twelve Boarders (1979)
Under an Umbrella (1979)
The House Where Sun Rises (1980)
Don Quixote on Asphalt (1988)
My Love, Don Quixote (1989)
Day of Standing Alone (1990)

References

External links 
 
 

1936 births
2003 deaths
South Korean film directors